George Grossmith Jr. (11 May 1874 – 6 June 1935) was an English actor, theatre producer and manager, director, playwright and songwriter, best remembered for his work in and with Edwardian musical comedies. Grossmith was also an important innovator in bringing "cabaret" and "revues" to the London stage. Born in London, he took his first role on the musical stage at the age of 18 in Haste to the Wedding (1892), a West End collaboration between his famous songwriter and actor father and W. S. Gilbert.

Grossmith soon became an audience favourite playing "dude" roles. Early appearances in musicals included George Edwardes's hit A Gaiety Girl in 1893, and Go-Bang and The Shop Girl in 1894. In 1895, Grossmith left the musical stage, instead appearing in straight comedies, but after a few years he returned to performing in musicals and Victorian burlesques. Early in the new century, he had a string of successes in musicals for Edwardes, including The Toreador (1901), The School Girl (1903), The Orchid (1903), The Spring Chicken (1905), The New Aladdin (1906), The Girls of Gottenberg (1907), Our Miss Gibbs (1909), Peggy (1911), The Sunshine Girl (1912) and The Girl on the Film (1913). The lanky Grossmith was often comically paired with the diminutive Edmund Payne. At the same time, he developed a reputation as a co-writer of musicals and revues, usually adding jokes.

Grossmith established himself as a major producer, together with Edward Laurillard, of such hits as Tonight's the Night (1914), Theodore & Co (1916) and Yes, Uncle! (1917). He wrote the long-running revue series that began with The Bing Boys Are Here (1916), scheduling these projects around his naval service in World War I. He then produced Eastward Ho! (1919) and produced, co-wrote, directed and sometimes starred in, Kissing Time (1919), A Night Out (1920), Sally (1921), The Cabaret Girl (1922), The Beauty Prize (1923) and Primrose (1924), many of these featuring Leslie Henson. He also continued to appear in other producers' shows, including The Naughty Princess (1920) and No, No, Nanette (1925).

Later, he performed in such pieces as Princess Charming (1926) and appeared in at least ten films for London Film Productions Ltd., among other films, in the 1930s. He produced The Land of Smiles and Cavalcade (both in 1931), and in 1933, he played Touchstone in a production of As You Like It.

Life and career

George Grossmith was born in Haverstock Hill, London, the eldest son of the writer and Gilbert and Sullivan star George Grossmith, and his mother was Emmeline Rosa, née Noyce. His grandfather was also named "George Grossmith", and even though he was the third George Grossmith, he was credited on stage as "George Grossmith Jnr". His brother was the actor Lawrence Grossmith.

Grossmith studied at University College School in London, and in Paris, and his parents hoped that he would follow an army career, but that was not to be. In 1895, Grossmith married burlesque and musical comedy actress Gertrude Elizabeth "Cissie" Rudge (1873–1951), whose stage name was Adelaide Astor, and who was one of five actress Rudge Sisters. Letty Lind was the most famous of these. Grossmith and his wife had three children, Ena Sylvia Victoria (1896–1944), who became a stage and film actress; George (1906–c.2000), who became a theatrical manager; and Rosa Mary (1907–1988; she married Col. Edward Harry George 1904–1957, and they had three sons, including John C. G. George).

Grossmith was known for "speaking" songs and for his easy comic grace on stage. He was tall and gangling, with a "face hardly less extraordinary than his curious legs and a humour as unctuous as his father's at his best."

Early career
Grossmith's first role in a musical was at the age of 18 in a small comic role in his father's collaboration with W. S. Gilbert, Haste to the Wedding. He next appeared in several small comic roles, including in The Baroness (1892).

Grossmith's breakthrough came in Morocco Bound (1893), where he made the most of the small role of Sir Percy Pimpleton by adding ad-libbed sight and word gags, becoming an audience favourite and establishing his style of playing aristocratic "silly-ass" or "dude" roles. This was followed by appearances in Go-Bang (1894 as Augustus Fitzpoop) and in George Edwardes's production of A Gaiety Girl (1893 as Major Barclay). He also played in Pick-me-up at the Trafalgar Square Theatre in 1894 with Jessie Bond and Letty Lind. Edwardes then hired Grossmith to create the part of Bertie Boyd in the hit musical The Shop Girl (1894). The 21-year-old actor wrote the lyrics to his character's hit song "Beautiful, bountiful Bertie", which he popularised in both London and New York. He eventually appeared in some 20 Edwardes shows, often interpolating his own songs into the shows.

Grossmith left the musical stage for about three years, appearing in straight comedies, but he returned in 1898 to take over in the musical Little Miss Nobody and then as Mark Antony in the burlesque, Great Caesar (1899), which Grossmith had written with Paul Rubens. The piece was not successful, but he wrote another (also unsuccessful piece), The Gay Pretenders (1900), in which he included roles for both himself and his famous father, that played at the Globe Theatre with a cast also including John Coates, Frank Wyatt, Letty Lind and Richard Temple.

Grossmith then returned to Edwardes's company as leading comedian, touring in Kitty Grey, and then starred in the Gaiety Theatre's hit The Toreador (1901).  Grossmith supplied some of his own lyrics ("Archie") but scored his biggest hit with Rubens's song "Everybody's Awfully Good to Me." He then played in The School Girl (1903) and subsequently toured America in the piece, but he mostly remained at the Gaiety for the next dozen years, starring in a number of hits and becoming one of the biggest stars of the Edwardian era. His roles in these hits included The Hon. Guy Scrymgeour in The Orchid (1903), Gustave Babori in The Spring Chicken (1905), Genie of The Lamp in The New Aladdin (1906), Otto, the prince, in The Girls of Gottenberg (1907), Hughie in Our Miss Gibbs (1909), Auberon Blowand in Peggy (1911) and Lord Bicester in The Sunshine Girl (1912). He often performed together with diminutive comic Edmund Payne. From 1904, he was a Freemason.

Grossmith co-wrote the successful Havana (1908), while he moved to another Edwardes theatre to play Count Lothar in A Waltz Dream. Grossmith was given writing credits for some of the Gaiety pieces, usually adaptations from French comedies (like The Spring Chicken) or collaborations with other writers (such as The Girls of Gottenberg), but he wrote the libretto to Peggy on his own. His contributions in collaborative pieces were primarily to add in jokes. He adapted The Dollar Princess (1909) for America (but not London) and also co-wrote some of London's earliest "revues", including the Rogues and Vagabonds, Venus, Oh! Indeed, Empire Theatre's Hullo ... London! (1910), Everybody's Doing It, Kill That Fly!, Eight-pence a Mile, and Not Likely. In addition to his writing and performing, he sometimes directed these musicals and revues.

Peak producing years
In 1913, Grossmith starred in The Girl on the Film first in London and then in New York, where he joined with Edward Laurillard, who had earlier produced his musical The Love Birds, to produce plays and musicals. Grossmith established himself as a major producer with Laurillard, bringing Potash and Perlmutter, by Montague Glass, to London in 1914 for a long run at the Queen's Theatre. They then produced the successful Tonight's the Night, based on the farce Pink Dominoes, first at the Shubert Theatre in New York in 1914 and then moved it to the Gaiety Theatre, London in 1915. Grossmith played The Hon. Dudley Mitten.

Back at the Gaiety Theatre, Grossmith wrote, produced and starred in the hit Theodore & Co (1916), based on a French comedy. Edwardes had died in 1915, however, and Grossmith was dissatisfied with the offer of the new management under Alfred Butt and Robert Evett, the executor of Edwardes's estate, and so he left the Gaiety and produced three successes, Mr Manhattan, Arlette (1917), and Yes, Uncle! (1917) elsewhere. His Oh! Joy (the British adaptation of Oh, Boy!, 1917) was also successful. He also wrote the tremendously successful revue series, The Bing Boys Are Here (1916), The Bing Girls are There (1917) and The Bing Boys on Broadway (1918). Grossmith fitted his work on all these productions around his naval service in World War I.

Grossmith and Laurillard built their own theatre, the Winter Garden, on the site of an old music hall in Drury Lane. They opened the theatre in 1919 with Grossmith and Leslie Henson starring in Kissing Time (1919, with a star-studded cast, a book by P.G. Wodehouse and Guy Bolton and music by Ivan Caryll), followed by A Night Out (1920). Grossmith and Laurillard also became managers of the Apollo Theatre in 1920 (they had produced The Only Girl there in 1916 and Tilly of Bloomsbury there in 1919). But expanding their operation caused Grossmith and Laurillard to end their partnership, with Grossmith retaining control of the Winter Garden.

Grossmith partnered with Edwardes's former associate, J. A. E. Malone, to produce a series of mostly adaptations of imported shows at the Winter Garden from 1921 to 1926: Sally (1921), The Cabaret Girl (1922, with book by Wodehouse and music by Jerome Kern), The Beauty Prize (1923, with Wodehouse and Kern), a revival of Tonight's the Night (1923), Primrose (1924, with music by George Gershwin), Tell Me More (1925, with words by Thompson and music by George Gershwin) and Kid Boots (1926 with music by Harry Tierney), many of them featuring Leslie Henson. Grossmith co-wrote some of the Winter Garden pieces, directed many of his own productions and starred in several, notably as Otis in Sally. Several of the later productions lost money, and Grossmith and Malone ended the partnership.

Grossmith also co-produced Oscar Asche's conception of Eastward Ho! (1919), Baby Bunting (both in 1919) and Faust on Toast (1921) at other theatres during this period. At the same time, in the early 1920s, while appearing less frequently in his own Winter Garden shows, he continued to appear in other shows, including The Naughty Princess (1920), the title role in a revival of The Gay Lord Quex (1923) and as Billy Early in the original British production of No, No, Nanette (1925). Around this time, Grossmith also worked as a programme adviser to the BBC, particular involved in comedy programming. He also negotiated on behalf of the BBC with theatre managers over their boycott on songs from plays, when provincial theatre managers had threatened to cancel tour contracts if excerpts from the new plays had already been broadcast by the BBC.

In their joint memoir Bring on the Girls!, P.G. Wodehouse and Guy Bolton relate a story about Grossmith holding auditions for Primrose. The young model-dancer-actress Sylvia Hawkes auditioned:

Later years and legacy

After 1926, Grossmith stopped producing, but he continued to perform, playing King Christian in Albert Szirmai's Princess Charming (1926) for producer Robert Courtneidge in New York, and Britain in The Five o'Clock Girl and Lady Mary (1928). In New York in 1930, and later in London (where it flopped), he starred in Ralph Benatzky's My Sister and I (aka Meet My Sister). He also appeared in at least ten films for London Films in the 1930s. During a brief sojourn in Hollywood, he appeared in several films produced at the Fox Studios, including Women Everywhere (1930), for which he also supplied the story, and Are You There? (1930).

In 1931–32, Grossmith was appointed managing director of the Theatre Royal, Drury Lane, producing The Land of Smiles and Cavalcade, but he resigned in 1932 to devote himself to cinema. In the 1930s, Grossmith appeared in (and wrote the screenplay, in two cases, for) a number of films. In 1933, he played Touchstone in a production of As You Like It in the Open Air Theatre, Regent's Park. Also in 1933, he wrote a memoir called G. G. The following year, he played Horner in The Country Wife at the Ambassadors Theatre.

According to musical theatre writer Andrew Lamb, Grossmith 
played a particular part in introducing American songs and American musical shows into the British musical theatre. It was George Grossmith Jr., who danced the cakewalk in The Toreador in 1901, who as lyricist and performer gave Jerome Kern an entree into the London theater in 1906, and who introduced "They Didn't Believe Me" to London in To-Night's the Night... (1915). It was he who co-authored those Empire and Alhambra revues that introduced ragtime song to London and he, too, who, as coproducer, gave Kern his first joint composer billing in London with Theodore & Co. in 1916, presented Oh, Joy! in 1919, and commissioned The Cabaret Girl and The Beauty Prize from Kern and Primrose from Gershwin. And, finally, it was he who made one of his last appearances in that London production of No, No, Nanette that preceded the New York opening.

The Wodehouse scholar Norman Murphy believes that Grossmith was the inspiration for Bertie Wooster.

Grossmith died in a London nursing home at the age of 61. He never received his promised knighthood.

Filmography

As an actor
A Gaiety Duet (1909) .... Honourable Hugh
The Argentine Tango and Other Dances (1913)
Women Everywhere (1930) .... Aristide Brown
Those Three French Girls (1930) .... Earl of Ippleton
Are You There? (1930) .... Duke of St. Pancras (aka Exit Laughing (USA))
Service for Ladies (1932) .... Mr. Westlake (aka Reserved for Ladies (USA))
Wedding Rehearsal (1932) .... Earl of Stokeshire
The Man with the Hispano (1933) (as Georges Grossmith) .... Lord Oswill (aka The Man in the Hispano-Suiza (USA))
L'Épervier (1933) .... Erik Drakton (aka Amoureux, Les (France))
The Girl from Maxim's (1933) .... The general
The Lady of Lebanon (1934) .... Le colonel Hobson
Princess Charming (1934) .... King of Aufland

As composer
Women Everywhere (1930) (lyrics: "All the Family")

As screenwriter
Women Everywhere (1930) (story)
Wedding Rehearsal (1932) (story)

Notes

References
Gänzl, Kurt.  The British Musical Theatre (Macmillan Press, 1986)
Gänzl, Kurt.  The Encyclopedia of the Musical Theatre (2nd ed., 2001, Schirmer)

External links 
 Biography of Grossmith
 
 
 Information about Grossmith credits
  from To-Night's the Night (1914)
Plays by George Grossmith at Great War Theatre

English male singers
English male film actors
English theatre managers and producers
Actor-managers
1874 births
1935 deaths
People from the London Borough of Camden
20th-century English male actors
English male dramatists and playwrights
English Freemasons